Bella Alubo (born Mabel Alubo, 9 August 1993) is a Nigerian musician, alternative R&B, hip-hop singer and songwriter, formerly signed under Tinny Entertainment alongside Ycee.

Early life
Alubo hails from Benue State, Nigeria, was born and raised in the city of Jos, she grew up as a poet which gifted her the ability to be a skilled songwriter.

Career
In 2018, Alubo dropped a collaborative EP, Late Night Vibrations with Ycee, and a follow up EP, Re-Bella, featuring BOJ, Victoria Kimani, Efya, and Sho Madjozi. In 2019 she dropped summer over EP featuring Mr Eazi, and many more. She dropped singles with Fasina and Lady Donli. In August 2019 she dropped “Agbani” remix, featuring Zlatan Ibile. She was nominated for the promising act to watch at the 2018 Nigeria Entertainment Awards and listed among 2018 promising artists. She has up to 20 million streams across various platforms . Bella eventually left Tinny Entertainment in September 2018.

In 2021, She released her debut studio album titled Bella Buffet and re-released her official single Location featuring Niniola in May 2022, under Benin City Entertainment. 

In 2022 she signed to Benin City Entertainment label founded by Nigerian-American, Elliot Osagie.

In 2022, Bella was featured in a single by The Notorious B.I.G  titled G.O.A.T. alongside Ty Dolla $ign and produced by Kayo and Elliot Osagie. The song contains Biggie's vocals from the Life After Death hit "I Love The Dough," with Jay-Z and Angela Winbush, in which he spoke about his incredible lifestyle.

On 29 May 2022, Bella was enlisted by Red Hot Org, a major HIV/AIDS organization, for a new project called Kele-le  alongside Lady Donli, Tomi Owo, Mz Kiss, and Oshun .
The four-track EP, which translates to girlfriend in pidgin and unignorable sound in Swahili, not only shows the artists' talents but also brings them together for a similar objective.

Discography

Albums/EPs

"Late Night Vibrations" (2018)
"Re-Bella" (2018)
"Summer's Over" (2019)
"Bella Buffet"(2021)

Selected singles
Here is the list of Bella Alubo's singles.
"Radio"
"Agbani"
"Gimme Love"

As featured
G.O.A.T (The Notorious B.I.G feat.  Ty Dolla $ign and Bella Alubo)

Award and nominations
Alubo has received some accolades and nominations which include Nigeria Entertainment Awards for 2018 Most Promising Act to Watch.

References

Living people
1993 births
Nigerian women musicians
Nigerian women pop singers
Nigerian women singer-songwriters
Nigerian singer-songwriters
Nigerian rhythm and blues singer-songwriters